Tatarsky Nagadak (Tatar Nuğaźağı; , Tatar Nuğazağı) is a rural locality (a village) and the administrative centre of Nagadaksky Selsoviet, Aurgazinsky District, Bashkortostan, Russia. The population was 451 as of 2010. There are 7 streets.

Geography 
Tatarsky Nagadak is located 39 km northeast of Tolbazy (the district's administrative centre) by road. Nagadak is the nearest rural locality.

References 

Rural localities in Aurgazinsky District